Igor Vori (born 20 September 1980) is a Croatian retired handball player and current coach. He is currently working as the sports director of the Croatian national team. 

Vori competed for Croatia in the 2004, 2008 and the 2012 Summer Olympics.

Club career
Vori played in RK Zagreb and has also played for FC Barcelona and Paris Saint-Germain. He won the EHF Champions League with HSV Hamburg during the 2012–13 season. Vori was shortlisted in the IHF's election of the 2009 World Handball Player of the Year. He retired in June 2018.

International career
Vori is World champion from 2003, and Olympic champion from 2004 with the Croatian national team. He received a silver medal at the 2005 World Championship, and a silver medal at the 2008 European Championship, where he also was voted Best defensive player.

At the 2008 Summer Olympics held in Beijing, Vori was part of the Croatian squad that reached the semifinals, after defeating Denmark in the quarter-final. They lost their semifinal against France and lost to Spain in the bronze medal match, ending fourth in the tournament.

At the 2009 World Championship held in Croatia, Vori was part of the silver medal winning team, as well as being voted Player of the Tournament, but was given a red card during the final match after pretending to throw the ball at a referee's face.

Vori was part of the Croatian squad at the 2012 Summer Olympics in London, where they lost to France in the semifinal, winning the bronze medal game against Hungary, as well as he has played with Croatia at the 2013 and 2015 World Championships, and 2014 and 2018 European Championships.

Coaching career
On 1 June 2020, following the resignation of Veselin Vujović, Vori was named the new head coach of RK Zagreb, which became his first head coaching job in career. On 9 October, he was sacked. In March 2022 he was announced as new head coach of U21 Croatia national team.

Honours
Zagreb
Croatian Premier League: 1997–98, 1998–99, 1999–00, 2000–01, 2003–04, 2004–05, 2007–08, 2008–09, 2016–17, 2017–18
Croatian Cup: 1998, 1999, 2000, 2004, 2005, 2008, 2009, 2017, 2018 

Conversano
Serie A: 2002–03
Italian Cup: 2003

FC Barcelona
Liga ASOBAL: 2005–06
Copa del Rey: 2007
Supercopa ASOBAL: 2006–07
Pirenees Leagues: 2005–06, 2006–07

HSV Hamburg
Bundesliga: 2010–11
DHB-Pokal: 2010
Super Cup: 2009, 2010
EHF Champions League: 2012–13

PSG
LNH Division 1: 2014–15, 2015–16
Coupe de France: 2014, 2015
Trophée des champions: 2014, 2015

Individual
Franjo Bučar State Award for Sport – 2004
Best defensive player at the 2008 European Championship
Player of the Tournament at the 2009 World Championship
Best line player at the 2010 European Championship

Orders
 Order of Danica Hrvatska with face of Franjo Bučar

References

External links
 
 
 
 

1980 births
Living people
Croatian male handball players
Olympic handball players of Croatia
Handball players at the 2004 Summer Olympics
Handball players at the 2008 Summer Olympics
Handball players at the 2012 Summer Olympics
Olympic gold medalists for Croatia
Olympic bronze medalists for Croatia
Handball players from Zagreb
RK Zagreb players
Liga ASOBAL players
Handball-Bundesliga players
FC Barcelona Handbol players
Olympic medalists in handball
Medalists at the 2012 Summer Olympics
Medalists at the 2004 Summer Olympics
Expatriate handball players
Croatian expatriate sportspeople in France
Croatian expatriate sportspeople in Germany
Croatian expatriate sportspeople in Italy
Croatian expatriate sportspeople in Spain
21st-century Croatian people